Alga (Alğa) is a town in the Aktobe Region of western Kazakhstan. It is situated on the western bank of the Ilek (Jelek) River, and on the railway line from Aktobe to Aralsk. Population: 

It used to have a chemical phosphate plant which is now a ruin, but caused a lasting environmental damage as large quantities of chemical waste was collected in ponds without insulation to the aquifer.

Climate

References

Populated places in Aktobe Region